Ibiza International Film Festival (Ibiza IFF) is an independent cinema event which takes place every spring on the Island[Sponsors were John Hurt, Terry Gilliam, Sir Alan Parker, Bigas Luna and Ángela Molina. At the 2nd edition of the Festival, Nacho Cano and Antonio Isasi-Isasmendi joined as Sponsors and José Manuel Lorenzo assumed the role of President of the Consulting Committee.

With the slogan The independent spirit, suggested by the Producer Jonathan Debin, this Festival promotes independent productions worldwide.
Its award and symbol is the Falcó d'Or, representing an Eleonora's falcon, a species which nests freely on the cliffs of Ibiza and Formentera and which recalls The Maltese Falcon, by John Huston.

2011 edition

V edition takes place from 4 to 8 May 2011 with Val Kilmer as the president of the Jury.

List of winners

Competitive section

Best film – Magic City Memoirs by Aaron K. Salgado
Best director –  Ed Gass-Donnelly for Small Town Murder Songs
Best actor (ex aequo) – J.R. Villareal, Michael Cardelle & Andrés Domínguez for Magic City Memoirs
Best actress – Melinda Shankar for Festival Of Lights
Best supporting actor – Jo Kelly for I Want To Be A Soldier
Best direction of photography – Dmitri Mass for “Ne Skazhu” (I’m Not Telling)
Best script – Aaron J. Salgado & J. D. Freixas for Magic City Memoirs
Best soundtrack – Anton Baybok & Igor Vdovin for “Ne Skazhu” (I’m Not Telling)
Special Jury Award – Jackie Burroughs  for Small Town Murder Songs
Special Mention – Fergus Riordan for I Want To Be A Soldier

Honorary awards
Independent Spirit prize – “LA RAFLE” by Rose Bosch
Antonio Isasi-Isasmendi Award – Francis Ford Coppola
Vicente Ribas Award – Royal Academy of Dramatic Art (RADA)

Balearic Spirit section
SOM TAUJÀ by Borja Zausen

2010 edition
At its IV edition, the Festival Jury comprised Jacqueline Bisset as president, Carlos Bardem and Antonio Isasi.

List of winners
Competitive section

Best film – 18 Years Later, by Edoardo Leo
Best director- Edoardo Leo for 18 Years Later
Best actor - Edoardo Leo for 18 Years Later
Best actress - Sabrina Impacciatore for 18 Years Later
Best supporting actor - Rik Barnett for Rebels without a Clue
Best supporting Actress - Cat Dowling for "Rebels without a clue"
Best direction of photography- Rebels without a Clue
Best script - Marco Bonini y Edoardo Leo por Eighteen years later
Best soundtrack - Rebels without a Clue
Special Falcó D'Or award – Eighteen years later, de Edoardo Leo

Honorary awards

Independent Spirit prize - Backyard, by Carlos Herrero
"Vicente Ribas" Award for the Promotion of Cinema - Academia de las Artes y las Ciencias Cinematográficas de España

Balearic Spirit section

First Prize - Dificultades, by Joan Cobos and Laura Martin

2009 edition
At its IIIrd edition, the Festival Jury comprised Cuba Gooding Jr. as president, Scottish filmmaker Bill Forsyth and Spanish critic José Eduardo Arenas.

List of winners
Competitive section

Best film - Li Tong, by Nian Liu
Best director - Nian Liu for Li Tong
Best actor - Nenad Jezdic for Tears for sale
Best actress - Zhicun Zhao for Li Tong
Best supporting actor - Kang Yao for Li Tong
Best production design- Tears for sale
Best direction of photography- Dark Streets
Best script - Nian Liu for Li Tong
Best editing - Kevin Fritz, and Nian Liu for Li Tong
Best soundtrack - George Accogny for Dark Streets
Special jury award - Uros Stojanovic for Tears for sale
Special Falcó D'Or award - Nian Liu for Li Tong

Honorary awards

Independent Spirit Prize - La Milagrosa, by Rafa Lara
"Vicente Ribas" Award for the Promotion of Cinema - Berlinale

Special awards

Audience award - A shine of rainbows, by Vic Sarin
New Director award - Darren Grodsky and Danny Jacobs for Humboldt County

Balearic Spirit section
The jury of this section comprised Antonio Isasi-Isasmendi and Carles Fabregat

First Prize - Microfísica, by Joan Carles Martorell
Accesit - "Se vende", by Mapi Galán

Videoclips section
The jury of this section comprised Michael Hoenig and Anjula Acharia-Bath

Best videoclip - SIA Soon will be found, by Claire Carre
Best Special Effects - Kanye West, Welcome to the Heartbreak, by Nabil

2008 edition
At its IInd edition, the Festival Jury comprised Michael Radford, Armand Assante, Margarita Chapatte, Michael Nyman, Richard Kwietnioski, Ray Loriga and Uri Fruchtmann.

List of winners
Competitive section
Best Film - Battle in Seattle (USA/Canada/Germany)
Best Director - Marco Carniti for Sleeping around
Best Actor - Josh Lucas in Death in love
Best Actress - Jacqueline Bisset in Death in love
Best Supporting Actor - Enrique Murciano in Mancora
Best Script - Boaz Yakim for Death in love
Best Photography - Paolo Ferrari for Sleeping around
Best Production Design - Emita Frigato for Sleeping around
Best Edition - Fernando Villena for Battle in Seattle
Best Sound Track - D. Barittoni y G. De Caterini for Sleeping around
Best Short Film - Tibor Martin for The power of free
Falcó D'or - Anna Galiena for Sleeping around
Special Audience Prize - Lilian and Pedro Rosado for La Mala
Special Jury Prize - Sleeping around

Honorary awards
Film Career - Antonio Isasi-Isasmendi
Special Independent Spirit Prize - Gerardo Olivares for 14 Kilómetros
Film Promotion "Premio Vicente Ribas" - La Cinémathèque de la Danse

2007 edition
At the Ibiza IFF Ist edition the Jury comprised Antonio Isasi-Isasmendi as President, Jonathan Debin, Michael Hoenig, Ronnie Taylor, Igor Fioravanti, Demián Bichir, Steve Norman, Anwen Rees Hurt, Timothy Burrill, Elfie A. Donnelly and Paul Arató.

List of winners
Competitive section
Best International Film - La Caja (Spain)
Best coproduced Film - The moon and the stars (Hungary/Italy/UK)
Best Director - Steve Barron for Choking Man
Best Brand New Director - A.J. Annila for Jade Warrior
Best Actor - Toby Jones in Infamous
Best Actress - Ángela Molina in La Caja
Best Supporting Actor - Alfred Molina in The moon and the stars
Best Supporting Actress - Elvira Minguez in La caja
Most Promising New Male Artist - Octavio Gómez in Choking Man
Most Promising New Female Artist - Eugenia Yuan in Choking Man
Best Scenography - Jade Warrior (Finland/China)
Best Photography Direction - Henri Blomberg for Jade Warrior
Best Script - Peter Barnes and Fabio Carpi for The moon and the stars
Special Jury Prize - Choking Man (USA)
Special Mention Jury Prize - California Dreamin' (Romania)
The Independent Spirit Prize - Longest night in Shanghai (Japan/China)
Best Sound Track - Nico Muhly for Choking Man

Honorary awards
Film Career - John Hurt
Freedom of Expression - George Clooney for Good Night, and Good Luck
Film Promotion "Premio Vicente Ribas" - INCAA
Creativity Prize - Terry Gilliam

External links
 Official site of the Ibiza IFF

References

Film festivals in Spain
Culture of Ibiza